La Gioconda is an 1899 play by the Italian writer Gabriele D'Annunzio. In November 1902 in New York, a Broadway version of the play was presented at the Victoria Theatre and featured the acclaimed Italian actress Eleonora Duse. La Gioconda was also adapted for film on at least four occasions: three times in the silent era and as a Mexican film in 1951.

Film adaptations
 Love Re-Conquered (La Gioconda) (1912), directed by Luigi Maggi
 The Devil's Daughter (1915), directed by Frank Powell
 La Gioconda (1916), directed by Eleuterio Rodolfi
 La Estatua de carne (1951), directed by Chano Urueta

References

1899 plays
Italian plays adapted into films
Plays by Gabriele D'Annunzio